The Tide is a  light rail line in Norfolk, Virginia, United States, owned and operated by Hampton Roads Transit (HRT). It connects Eastern Virginia Medical School, downtown Norfolk, Norfolk State University, and Newtown Road. Service began on August 19, 2011, making it the first light rail system in Virginia. Fares match local bus fares and the line accepts HRT's GO Passes. Trains generally run every 15 minutes, increasing to every 10 minutes during peak periods and every 30 minutes during early mornings and late evenings.

History 
In the late 1980s, the Tidewater Transportation District Commission (TTDC) began producing studies that would examine the feasibility of expanding transit corridors between Norfolk and its neighboring cities of Chesapeake, Portsmouth, Suffolk, and Virginia Beach; these included a study for the cost effectiveness of restoring passenger rail service in 1986 and a rail systems analysis in 1991. The alignment would have run along an exclusive double-track right-of-way that followed the Norfolk Southern Railway and contained 13 stations. In 1999, the Virginia Beach City Council asked its residents in a referendum whether it should adopt a local ordinance to help develop and finance the light rail project. On November 2, Virginia Beach residents voted against the referendum, 56percent to 44percent.

After Virginia Beach pulled out of a proposal that would have seen the construction of a light rail line connecting downtown Norfolk with the Virginia Beach oceanfront in 1999, Norfolk began developing a network that would be constructed entirely within its city limits.

Beginning in 2000, HRT and federal transit officials worked to create a plan that would attract federal funding. On September 22, 2006, the Federal Transit Administration announced that the proposal met federal criteria for design, and would receive funding for a final design. On October 1, 2007, the FTA signed the agreement to appropriate $128 million for the construction of the network. The remainder of the project will be divided three ways, with the city of Norfolk contributing $33 million, the Commonwealth of Virginia contributing $31.9 million, and $39.2 million being contributed from other federal sources.

Officials announced in June 2007 that the system would be called The Tide, a name that beat out other proposed names, including Bay Runner, First Rail, Dash, Bay Breeze, Sail and Shore Line.

Construction problems 
The line had been planned to open in January 2010, but cost overruns, extended testing of trains, and electronic signage required three delays.

In January 2010, HRT's executive director, Michael Townes, was pressured by the Board of Directors and ultimately agreed to step down after the project overshot its budget by $100 million and missed by one year its operational deadline. A majority of the board members cited poor management and communication on his part. He was to serve at full pay and benefits helping with a transition and continue to seek additional funding until September 2010, after which the Board agreed to a severance package of full pay and benefits for another full year. As an interim measure, the Board hired former VDOT Commissioner Philip Shucet for 1 year effective February 1, 2010 at the rate of $40,000 per month to lead the agency, with a mandate to restore financial integrity and communication pending selection of a new Executive Director.

In May 2010 elections, voters ousted Norfolk city councilman Randy Wright, a long-time incumbent, HRT board member, and light rail supporter. His opponent, also an advocate of light rail, cited the waste and delays under Towne's administration. Another HRT board member, Paige Washington, also lost a reelection bid in Hampton. News media sources reported that "Three million dollars [of HRT funds designated for projects on the Virginia Peninsula] were diverted to Norfolk to [help] pay for its light rail cost overrun".

Opening 
On June 21, 2011, HRTs announced the line would open on August 19 initially with demonstration rides followed by regular service beginning on August 22. Due to high ridership during the initial demonstration period, estimated at over 46,000 riders, the demonstration period was extended, with regular service to begin on August 28.

On September 21, 2011, Hampton Roads Transit announced the introduction of online ticketing and onboard WiFi to The Tide.

Financing 
The Tide cost $318 million to construct, and is estimated to cost $6.2 million a year to operate.

The line was primarily financed by a $232 million grant from the Federal Transit Administration approved in October 2007. Additional federal funding came from a $32.8 million grant from the American Recovery and Reinvestment Act. The final cost of the project was estimated to be $318.5 million, $106 million over the original estimate — or approximately just under $27 million per kilometer ($43 million per mile)."

Rolling stock 

In September 2007, HRT’s commission voted to purchase nine Siemens-built S70 vehicles, similar to those currently in operation in Houston, Texas and Charlotte, North Carolina. These vehicles formed The Tide's initial fleet of light rail vehicles. The first car arrived on October 6, 2009.

Service 

The trains generally run every 15 minutes; they run every 10 minutes during peak periods and every 30 minutes during early weekend mornings and late evenings. Light rail service is offered from 6:00 a.m. through 10 p.m Mondays through Thursdays, 6:00 a.m. through midnight on Fridays and Saturdays, 7:00 a.m through 9:00 p.m. on Sundays, and 9:00 a.m. through 9:00 p.m. on federal holidays.

Ridership 
Daily ridership in 2011 was projected at 2,900 passengers, increasing to 7,130 passengers by 2030. Actual daily ridership up to April 17, 2012 was approximately 4,900, allowing the service to reach its goal of 1 million rides 150 days earlier than had been projected.

Route 

The Tide is designed with the hope that TOD (Transit-oriented development) will be constructed along the light rail line, creating a smart growth transit corridor to help guide growth using compact mixed-use development practices, as well as curbing traffic congestion.

Most of the Tide's route east of downtown Norfolk operates on newly-laid track along the former Norfolk Southern Railway line that runs due east to the resort area of Virginia Beach.  The Norfolk Southern Railway had previously abandoned that line.  That right-of-way had carried both freight and passenger traffic until the end of World War II, and then operated as a freight-only railway for several additional decades.  The current eastern end of The Tide is at Newtown Road, which is the Norfolk-Virginia Beach boundary line.

By contrast, The Tide's route from the Harbor Park area west within downtown Norfolk and north-west to the Medical Center area is entirely new right-of-way.

Stations

Future expansion 
The Commonwealth of Virginia's Department of Rail & Public Transportation is studying possible extensions to The Tide in several different directions within the multi-city Hampton Roads area.
Hampton Roads Transit, the Hampton Roads Transportation Planning Organization, and local cities are exploring extensions of the starter line.

Chesapeake 
One possible extension would run south from Norfolk, probably terminating in the Greenbrier area of Chesapeake, Virginia.

Norfolk 
A second possible extension would continue The Tide from the Medical Center terminus to Naval Station Norfolk, which would connect Old Dominion University to the light rail service.  The naval base is one of the largest employers in the Hampton Roads area and ODU is a large public university. In 2018, HRT determined this extension would be too costly and instead began to focus on an extension in the eastern portion of the city to include Military Circle.

Peninsula 
The Peninsula Rapid Transit Project is exploring the feasibility of light rail in Newport News. Likely stops for The Tide on the Peninsula would include downtown Newport News, the Newport News Amtrak passenger railway station, the Oyster Point area, and Newport News/Williamsburg International Airport.  An extension between downtown Newport News and downtown Hampton is also being considered.

Virginia Beach 
This proposed LRT extension would continue along the former Norfolk Southern (NS) Railway right of way. Major stops would be located at Virginia Beach Town Center in the Pembroke area, near Oceana Naval Air Station, and would terminate in the resort area at the Virginia Beach Convention Center, a few blocks west of the Atlantic Ocean.  A possible spur would branch at the NS Railway's Oceana Junction (just east of London Bridge Road and just north of Potters Road) and use the existing abandoned railway right-of-way along the west side of Oceana Naval Air Station to the south.  As another possible LRT extension, most of the former NS Railway line from the Witchduck Road area south to the Virginia Beach Municipal Center remains currently undeveloped.

In 2011 the city of Virginia Beach suggested it might extend The Tide light rail service east from the Newtown Road terminus. Virginia Beach's mayor at the time, Will Sessoms, said the city hoped to purchase the right of way. The extension is estimated to cost $254 million to the Town Center and $807 million to the Oceanfront.

In 2016, voters in Virginia Beach rejected expansion of the light rail into the municipality. Consequently, all planning for extension of the system into Virginia Beach has been halted indefinitely.

History 
In November 1999, the City of Virginia Beach conducted a referendum regarding the construction and operation of light rail into Virginia Beach along the Norfolk Southern (NS) railroad line. The proposed route would connect downtown Norfolk to the Virginia Beach oceanfront. The referendum led to a community discussion of the proposed light rail and feeder bus system. Local media and special interest groups debated the matter in great detail, using information provided by a Draft Environmental impact statement (DEIS). Voters of Virginia Beach rejected the proposed light rail system citing possible unwanted bad elements a passenger train could bring.

Virginia Beach City Council then passed a 10-year resolution declaring that the city would no longer have any future involvement in the proposed light rail line.

Years later, a major economic and development hub was built along the NS corridor, known as Virginia Beach Town Center. The new Town Center, along with record high gas prices in 2008, changed the narrative and resulted in new public interest in rail again.

Virginia Beach then purchased the section of track within their jurisdiction from NS.

In April 2012, the Virginia Beach City Council voted 10–1 to allow voters to determine the fate of the extension in the November 2012 general election.

In the April 2011 State of the City, Sessoms said "whether the corridor is eventually developed with Bus Rapid Transit or a light rail line is unknown at this time," citing cost and ridership issues.

In April 2011, HRT paused the study until 9–12 months of ridership data from the Tide Light Rail in Norfolk is collected.

In November 2012, voters approved a non-binding referendum supporting expansion of light rail into Virginia Beach by a 62 percent majority. A study to fix costs for the project will be completed in 2014. The State of Virginia has pledged $155 million towards the extension to Virginia Beach, as well as lending up to $30 million from the Virginia Transportation Infrastructure Bank. The final route selected by the Virginia Beach City Council was the 3.5 mile short extension to the Town Center at Virginia Beach in mid-2015.

On November 8, 2016, after a successful vote four years earlier and a 30 percent Preliminary Design finished a month earlier, 57 percent of Virginia Beach voters disapproved the referendum regarding to use city funds to pay part of the Town Center extension, which would have been close to $90 million. As a result, all work on the light rail extension has been stopped, including discontinuing the order for three more light rail cars and Virginia's Secretary of Transportation Aubrey Layne reappointed the $155 million back to the Smart Scale program for transportation funding throughout the Commonwealth. The cost of extending the line was $243.1 million, with around $80 million per mile. , Virginia Beach City Council has several months to decide what to do with the purchased railroad line. If they could not decide, the city must refund the $20 million back to Virginia.

Based on the public referendum voting results, the light rail project was officially cancelled in Virginia Beach.

See also 
Light rail
Light rail in North America
Hampton Roads Transit

References

External links 

Hampton Roads Transit (HRT)
HRT's Ride The Tide website
VA Dept of Rail & Public Transit (DRPT)
DRPT – Norfolk Light Rail
Extensions
DRPT – Hampton Roads Transit Vision Plan
Hampton Roads Regional Vision Plan map

 
Hampton Roads Transit
Transportation in Norfolk, Virginia
Light rail in Virginia
Electric railways in Virginia
2011 establishments in Virginia
750 V DC railway electrification
Railway lines opened in 2011